Fauntleroy Creek is a stream in the Fauntleroy neighborhood of West Seattle, Washington, United States. It flows for about a mile from its headwaters in the 32-acre (129,000 m²) ravine of Fauntleroy Park to its outlet just south of the state ferry terminal on Puget Sound's Fauntleroy Cove, dropping 300 feet (100 m) vertically along the way. It currently supports cutthroat trout and coho salmon.

The creek, park, and neighborhood were named after the cove, itself named by one George Davidson in 1857 after his fiancée, Ellinor Fauntleroy.

External links
 Fauntleroy Watershed Council

Landforms of Seattle
Rivers of Washington (state)
Rivers of King County, Washington
West Seattle, Seattle